The franc was the currency of Cambodia between 1875 and 1885. It was equal to the French franc and was similarly subdivided into 100 centimes. It circulated alongside the piastre (equal to the Mexican peso) with 1 piastre = 5.37 francs. It replaced the tical and was replaced by the piastre. No paper money was issued.

Coins
Coins were issued in denominations of 5, 10, 25 and 50 centimes, 1, 2 and 4 francs and 1 piastre. The 5 and 10 centimes were struck in bronze, with the remaining pieces in silver. All the coins were dated 1860 but were minted (mostly in Belgium) in 1875. They all bear the portrait of King Norodom. In about 1900, some of the silver coins were restruck but at approximately 15% reduced weights.

See also

 French Indochinese piastre

References

 Jean Lecompte (2000) Monnaies et Jetons des Colonies Françaises.

External links 
Cambodian Coins of Norodom I
Cambodian Currency Collection - Depicts every banknote issued by National Bank of Cambodia

Currencies of Cambodia
Modern obsolete currencies
Economic history of Cambodia
1875 establishments in Asia
1885 disestablishments in Asia
19th-century economic history